Chakora, (Sanskrit: चकोर) is a legendary bird described in Hindu mythology and is considered to be a partridge, most likely based on the Chukar Partridge. In mythology (for example in the Mritchaktika) it is believed to feed on the beams of the moon, which is Chandra. The association of Chakora and Chandra has given rise to a number of folk love stories in North India.

In the Mahabharata, when Kuchela was on his way to meet Krishna, he saw the Chakora pakshi. He was a rich man by the time he reached his house after meeting Krishna. Therefore the Chakora pakshi is believed to bring good luck.

References

Hindu legendary creatures
Legendary birds